The fifteenth Connecticut House of Representatives district elects one member of the Connecticut House of Representatives. Its current representative is Bobby Gibson. The district consists of part of the towns of Bloomfield and Windsor.

List of representatives

Recent elections

External links 
 Google Maps - Connecticut House Districts

References

15
Windsor, Connecticut
Bloomfield, Connecticut